NA-157 Vehari-II is a constituency for the National Assembly of Pakistan.

Election 2002 

General elections were held on 10 Oct 2002. Ishaq Khan Khakwani of PML-Q won by 61,849 votes.

Election 2008 

General elections were held on 18 Feb 2008. Azeem Daultana of PPP won by 49,299 votes.

Election 2013 

General elections were held on 11 May 2013. Sajid Mehdi of PML-N won by 69,049 votes and became the  member of National Assembly.

Election 2018 

General elections are scheduled to be held on 25 July 2018.

See also
NA-156 Vehari-I
NA-158 Vehari-III

References

External links 
Election result's official website

NA-168